Teenagers (often stylized as teenagers) is a Canadian web series created by M. H. Murray and Sara Tamosauskas. With an ensemble cast that includes former Degrassi stars Chloe Rose and Raymond Ablack, Teenagers presents various storylines in the form of vignettes and focuses on social issues such as teen angst, racism, violence, slut-shaming, and sexuality.

The first season premiered on YouTube in early 2014. The second season premiered online July 26, 2015; the first episode of the second season subsequently went viral on YouTube. A third and final season premiered online November 5, 2017.

Since its release, Teenagers has amassed more than 15 million combined views online and has received numerous accolades, including an Indie Series Award, several IAWTV Award nominations, and a Canadian Screen Award nomination.

Background 

Teenagers initially attracted media attention because its cast included former Degrassi stars Chloe Rose and Raymond Ablack. Louis Chunovic of Playback published a piece on the series, writing that "the young creators of Teenagers had to have plenty of luck, pluck, talent, and grit to get this far. And that portends a Hollywood ending".

M. H. Murray—who wrote, directed, and edited the series—began working on the concept in 2013 when he was 19 years old and in film school. When interviewed about his inspirations for Teenagers, Murray said:

Speaking to IndieWire, Murray claimed that he created the series as a response to "white-washed" teen-driven television that he watched while growing up, such as One Tree Hill; he also criticized what he perceived as a lack of people of color and LGBT characters on television that weren't "evil, damaged, or hyper-sexualized". Murray has cited Issa Rae's web series The Misadventures of Awkward Black Girl and Larry Clark's 1995 film Kids as inspirations for the series.

All three seasons of the series were filmed in and around Mississauga on a shoe-string budget. The first two seasons of the series were funded "out of pocket". Murray approached actor Emmanuel Kabongo with the scripts and asked him to help produce the series, and they subsequently cast the rest of the characters together using actors from Toronto. Sara Tamosauskas co-wrote the first season alongside Murray. Kabongo ultimately served as executive producer for the first season, in addition to acting in all three seasons of the series.

For the second and third seasons of the series, Orphan Black director T.J. Scott served as executive producer. Garrett Hnatiuk, who portrays Porky in the series, co-wrote the second season with Murray. Murray wrote the third season by himself.

Plot 
The series presents various storylines and characters in the form of vignettes. The central storylines of the first season revolve around Bree (Chloe Rose), who loses her virginity to someone with chlamydia, and T (Emmanuel Kabongo), who struggles with racism and bullying. The first season also focuses on a love triangle between T, Olive (Dana Jeffrey), and Jeremy (Nick Stojanovic), while the second and third seasons focus more on the female characters in the series, most notably a lesbian relationship between Olive and Sara (Allyson Pratt).

Cast and characters

Release 
Since its release, Teenagers has amassed more than 15 million combined views on YouTube over the course of three seasons.

Season 1 
The first season consists of eight episodes. The first two episodes premiered on a dedicated YouTube channel on January 19, 2014. The premiere was covered by online blogs as well as traditional media outlets in Toronto. Upon release, it was voted number one in the "Indie Series Of The Week" poll by WeLoveSoaps.com users for the week of January 19 to 25, 2014.

Season 2 
The second season consists of nine episodes. The first episode of the second season premiered online July 26, 2015, and subsequently went viral; it has since been viewed over 6 million times on YouTube. The remaining episodes were released on a weekly basis throughout the summer.

Season 3 
On November 16, 2016, a prologue episode was released on YouTube, alongside an Indiegogo campaign, seeking funds to complete the third season. The campaign ultimately raised over $22,000. A trailer was released on October 25, 2017. The third season, which consists of four episodes, excluding the prologue, premiered at the Carlton Cinema on November 1, 2017. The first episode was released online November 5, 2017.

Reception

Critical response 
Teenagers has received positive reviews from critics and has frequently been compared to the Degrassi franchise and the UK television series Skins. In an interview with CBC's q radio show, Murray refuted Degrassi comparisons, saying that while he "respects" the show, he believes that Teenagers is "a fresh take on that experience". Further, CBC wrote: "Murray ... is telling gritty and authentic stories about teens because he believes we gloss over youth and under represent the realities of young people living on the margins of mainstream society".

Now called the series "sexy" and "provocative", concluding that "because it’s not held hostage by the same rules as big network television shows, it pushes the boundaries". Patrick Dennis Jr. of Urbanology Magazine dubbed it "Degrassi meets HBO". Susie Stone of culturestarved.com wrote: "I saw humans. Shattering and trembling, but at times so quiet and beautifully real. I saw short spurts of what is really happening in the teen world. This series is evocative, sweet, daring, and scary". Kyrie Scarce of TalkNerdyWithUs.com wrote: "If the story elements of sex, drugs, and wild parties sound too familiar, don’t worry—the joy of Teenagers lies in its execution, where psychological honesty is the name of the game". Jen McNeely of shedoesthecity.com described the cinematography and post-production as "slick and impressive".

Accolades 
Since its release, Teenagers has won several accolades. In 2016, Murray and Hnatiuk won the award for Best Screenplay at the Vancouver Web Series Festival and Ablack won the Indie Series Award for Best Supporting Actor – Drama. Kabongo was nominated for Best Performance in a Series Produced for Digital Media by the Academy of Canadian Cinema and Television for his work in the second season. In 2017, the series received six IAWTV Award nominations.

In 2018, the series received three nominations at the 9th annual Indie Series Awards, including Best Drama Series. Also that year, at the 5th annual Vancouver Web Series Festival, Teenagers won the award for Best Canadian Series, which came with a $5,000 prize.

References

External links
Teenagers on YouTube

See also 

2014 web series debuts
Canadian drama web series
Canadian LGBT-related web series
YouTube original programming
2010s Canadian LGBT-related drama television series